The Exterminator is a steel roller coaster located at Kennywood amusement park in West Mifflin, Pennsylvania, near Pittsburgh. The coaster was manufactured by Reverchon Industries.

The ride is heavily themed around the concept of the rider as a rat attempting to escape from exterminators. The concept is a pun of the term ''Wild Mouse", which describes this type of coaster, characterized by small cars (4 people/car for Exterminator) and sharp turns. Much of the theming takes place in the line for the ride, which includes such elaborate media as fake news broadcasts. The ride is very dark and unique, as the introduction says "unlike any ride you've rode before".  Like other spinning wild mouse coasters, the cars face forwards for the first half of the ride, but are free to spin during the second half.

History
In September 1998, Kennywood officially announced the Exterminator as their sixth roller coaster and the park's first ever indoor coaster, complimenting the park's history of iconic dark rides. Described as "a subterranean roller coaster adventure", the tracks are fast, rough, include a few sudden falls, and end with a fast finale that includes flashing lights, and the car seemingly spinning out of control.  The coaster itself would be created by French manufacturer Reverchon while the ride's storyline and theming were developed by R&R Creative Amusement Designs and the ride's four exterminator animatronics were designed by Sally Corporation. The Exterminator is also notable for being the first ride in Kennywood history to be built outside of the park's original boundaries. 

The ride soft-opened on April 16, 1999 to media personnel and members of roller coaster enthusiast organizations such as the American Coaster Enthusiasts (ACE) before officially opening to the public on April 18. When the attraction first opened, the exterior of the showbuilding was bare concrete until receiving a more detailed brick exterior with fake windows as well as a larger, three-dimensional entrance sign in 2000.

The ride is rather popular among park guests and is usually has one of the park's longest lines, being usually or beyond a 2 hour wait.

Since the ride's opening, some of its theming has deteriorated over time. The news broadcast pre-show that played in the queue line was deactivated some time in the late-2000's. Also, there was previously a pest control van parked outside of the ride's entrance. The van would play pre-recorded dispatches from a panicked team of exterminators over its radio. For unknown reasons, the van was moved to the park's storage lot where it was parked for many years but, as of 2023, it is no longer there. When the park introduced their Speedy Pass virtual queue system in 2022, some of the props in the queue room were removed to make room for a separate line for guests using Speedy Pass.

Ride Experience

Queue 
Riders enter the queue line through a concrete tunnel passing underneath the ride's logo. Turning right, the riders walk down a short ramp and then turn left into the main queue room themed to an underground electrical substation decorated with electrical cabinets, fuse boxes, gauges, and meters. A red button located on the far side of the room can be pushed by guests and after a certain number of pushes, it activates two sirens mounted to the ceiling which light up red and sound a loud buzzer. 

In the earlier days of the attraction, a looping pre-show would be played on two TV monitors featuring emergency news broadcasts from the fictional WKIF news station. A news anchor would explain that 8-foot tall mutant rats had breached the underground utility tunnels beneath the fictional town of Kennyville and were causing many buildings to collapse due to damages in the foundations. It is reported that employees of the Kennyville Power Company that had been sent to investigate the situation have mysteriously gone missing and that a team of exterminators from a high-tech pest control company, Vermin Inc., were now being sent into the tunnels to kill the rats. The anchor instructs the viewers to stay in their homes and only to evacuate if they feel tremors beneath the foundation.

Ride 

Entering the dimly-lit loading station, riders enter the four passenger rat-themed cars and are secured with a seatbelt and an overhead lap bar. The car is dispatched and passes by a large exhaust fan. Continuing straight down a dark hallway, an animatronic Vermin Inc. exterminator dressed in a bright orange hazmat suit appears, aiming a poison gas gun at the riders. In the ride's early years, the exterminators would blast fog illuminated by green light, giving the riders the illusion of being sprayed with rat poison. The ride car makes a sharp turn to the left and begins to ascend the lift hill. Nearing the top of the hill, a spotlight reveals another exterminator animatronic standing on the left side of the track who calls for backup into his radio. 

The car crests the top of the hill and makes another sharp turn to the left into a straightaway where another exterminator waits at the end of the hall and tries to blast the riders as the car makes a U-turn. Making another U-turn, the car rolls toward a large electrical transformer, which the car swerves away from with another hairpin turn. After navigating one more hairpin, the car passes under a sign reading "DANGER-BOILER ROOM". The car then makes a sharp left into the ride's first drop into a large boiler room, passing by a giant furnace. 

The car rises again making two more left turns into its biggest drop. The car ascends into a double-up and encounters another exterminator animatronic as it takes a left turn into another hallway. At the end of the hall is a large mirror that gives the riders the illusion of colliding with another car. As the car makes another U-turn, the spin lock mechanism on the car disengages, allowing the car to spin freely. The car spins out of control through three hairpin turns in pitch darkness before emerging at the gates of the giant furnace. The car enters the furnace illuminated by bright red lights, completing a wide turn, before exiting the furnace into a sudden dip and a final "bunny hop" hill. The car turns left into the final brake run, slowing down the car and re-locking the spinning mechanism. Rolling into the loading station, the riders disembark and exit into a hallway and re-emerge onto the midway from the left side of the ride building.

References

External links 
Exterminator at Ultimate Roller Coaster
Exterminator at Kennywood.com
Exterminator fact sheet at Kennywood.com

Kennywood
Wild Mouse roller coasters
Roller coasters introduced in 1999
Spinning roller coasters
Sally Corporation animatronics
1999 establishments in Pennsylvania
Enclosed roller coasters